Alice Municipal Golf Course is located in Alice, Texas, it features 6,099 yards of golf from the longest tees for a par of 71. The course rating is 67.8 and it has a slope rating of 108.  Alice golf course opened in 1950. Mario Garcia manages the course as the General Manager.

Golf clubs and courses in Texas
Buildings and structures in Jim Wells County, Texas
Alice, Texas